The 1982–83 SM-liiga season was the eighth season of the SM-liiga, the top level of ice hockey in Finland. 10 teams participated in the league, and HIFK Helsinki won the championship.

Standings

Replay for 8th place
 Kärpät - Kiekko-Reipas 2:7

Playoffs

Quarterfinals
 Ilves - SaiPa 2:0 (4:1, 3:2)
 TPS - Tappara 1:2 (2:7, 9:5, 2:3)

Semifinal
 Jokerit - Tappara 3:0 (4:3, 3:1, 5:4)
 HIFK - Ilves 3:1 (8:1, 1:7, 6:2, 3:2 P)

3rd place
 Ilves - Tappara 2:0 (5:3, 8:5)

Final
 Jokerit - HIFK 2:3 (4:3 P, 7:4, 2:6, 2:5, 2:3)

Relegation
 HPK Hämeenlinna - Lukko Rauma 3:0 (4:1, 6:1, 3:0)
 Kärpät Oulu - JoKP Joensuu 3:2 (14:3, 6:7, 10:1, 1:4, 4:1)

External links
 SM-liiga official website

1982–83 in Finnish ice hockey
Fin
Liiga seasons